Callichroma gounellei is a species of beetle in the family Cerambycidae. It was described by Achard in 1910. It is known from French Guiana.

References

Callichromatini
Beetles described in 1910
Endemic fauna of French Guiana